The 1999 Memphis Tigers football team represented the University of Memphis in the 1999 NCAA Division I-A football season. Memphis competed as a member of the Conference USA and were coached by Rip Scherer.  The Tigers played their home games at the Liberty Bowl Memorial Stadium.

Schedule

References

Memphis
Memphis Tigers football seasons
Memphis Tigers football